Troglotrematidae is a family of trematodes belonging to the order Plagiorchiida.

Genera:
 Beaveria Lee, 1965
 Macroorchis Goto, 1919
 Nanophyetus Chapin, 1927
 Nephrotrema Baer, 1931
 Pseudotroglotrema Yamaguti, 1971
 Sellacotyle Wallace, 1935
 Skrjabinophyetus Dimitrova & Genov, 1967
 Troglotrema Odhner, 1914
 Xiphidiotrema Senger, 1953

References

Platyhelminthes